Carlo Roberto Polli (born 7 February 1989 in Lugano) is a Swiss footballer who plays for Mendrisio-Stabio.

Club career
Polli began his career with Team Ticino U-18, the youth team of AC Lugano. In mid-2006 he was promoted to the first team. He made his professional debut for Lugano before leaving abroad. On 1 September 2008 Polli was signed by Genoa for their youth team, which plays in Campionato Nazionale Primavera. In the same season he won Coppa Italia Primavera against AS Roma and Supercoppa Primavera against Palermo. On 5 February 2010 Genoa loaned him to Swiss club FC Locarno until the end of the season 2010. In the 2010–11 season Polli was loaned to FC Chiasso and in July 2011, he signed with Maltese club Ħamrun Spartans.

On 1 May 2016, he made his debut for Stallion in a 4-2 defeat against 2016 UFL Cup Champions, Global.

Polli signed with Mendrisio-Stabio on 2 January 2019.

References

1989 births
Living people
Swiss men's footballers
Swiss expatriate footballers
Expatriate footballers in Italy
Expatriate footballers in Malta
FC Lugano players
Genoa C.F.C. players
FC Locarno players
FC Chiasso players
Association football midfielders
Sportspeople from Lugano
Swiss people of Italian descent
Stallion Laguna F.C. players